Attapeu is a province of Laos in the southeast of the country. Its capital city lies at Attapeu (Muang Samakkixay).

It was known as the "land of heroism". There are two biodiversity areas: Dong Ampham Forest (200,000 ha) and Xepaine Forest. A large part of the province is managed by the Dong Ampham National Biodiversity Conservation Area.

History 
The province was part of the Lane Xang Kingdom during the reign of King Saysethathirath. Earlier to this it was a habitat of wild buffaloes known as "Idkabue" (meaning, 'buffalo dropping'), which, in the French colonial regime, became "Attapeu". During the revolutionary war against the French, the province was the headquarters of the National Liberation Front. By the end of the war, much of the area was destroyed, remnants of which can be seen even now in some stretches of the Ho Chi Minh Road.

Geography 
It borders Sekong province to the north, Vietnam (Kom Tum) to the east, Virachey National Park of Cambodia (Ratanakiri and Stung Treng) to the south, and Champasak province to the west. Notable settlements in the province include Attapeu, Ban Nonghin, Ban Xoutouat, Ban Nong Songhong, Ban Renthuk, Ban Phiahom, Ban Choim, Ban Pakha, Ban Onglouang, Ban Het, Muang May, Ban kong Han, Ban Xakhe, and Ban Dakkrong.

The province's terrain is rugged. Its capital city Attapeu (Samakkhixay District) is in a valley. The Bolaven Plateau stretches across Attapeu as well as three others provinces, Champasak, Salavan, and Sekong. The landscape of the province consists of thick forest, rivers and streams and plains areas in the backdrop of mountains such as Phou Saphong and Phou Luang.
The principal rivers are the Xe Kong, Xe Kaman, and the Xe Xou River and the province is difficult to traverse in the rainy season. The province also has several waterfalls of note. These include the 23 m high, 120 m wide Tad Saephe Waterfall in Xepaine Forest, the 10 m high, 30 m wide Tad Samongphak Waterfall between Houay Samong and Xepaine River, Tad Phok Waterfall, and Tad Phaphong Waterfall, running from Xe Xou River. During the American War in Vietnam, parts of the Ho Chi Minh Trail passed through the province. The main roads are Route 13, the most important road in the country, and Route 11. The main settlements are Attapeu, Xaysetha, and Sanamxai.

Protected areas 

Dong Ampham National Biodiversity Conservation Area (NBCA) is the protected area which lies in Attapeu province (on the northeastern part) and Sekong province (on the southeastern part). It is in the southeast corner of Laos on the border with Vietnam. The NBCA is heavily forested and covers about 200,000 hectares. Established in 1993, it is one of the 23 National Biodiversity Conservation Areas of Laos. Dong Ampham is home to "some of the last intact areas of lowland and tropical forests remaining in mainland Southeast Asia." Topographical features include Xe Kaman and Xe Xou Rivers,  and the volcanic lake Nong Fa Lake. Tigers and Clouded leopard are recorded fauna in remote areas.

The 71,400 hectare Attapu Plain is an important bird area (IBA) adjacent to the NBCA. The topography includes wetlands, such as the Xe Khaman and the Xe Xou Rivers, as well as freshwater lakes and pools. Dry forest landscapes, dry deciduous forest, shingle and stony beaches are habitats. Notable avifauna are the lesser fish eagle Ichthyophaga humilis, red-headed vulture Sarcogyps calvus, and white-rumped vulture Gyps bengalensis.

Administrative divisions 
The province is composed of the following districts:

Demographics 
Lao Loum people in Attapeu outnumber those in other nearby provinces. Its population is reported to be 110,000 and consists of several ethnic communities; 15 major tribes are reported in the province which include Lao, Alak, Katang, Kaleum, Katou, Suay, Oy, Taoy, Sadang, Nge, Lavea, Lavenh, Cheuang, Tariang and Nyaheung groups.

Economy 

Attapeu's economy is largely agricultural. In this province, the trade in wild life is significant (though underestimated by the government) and hence its conservation is important. The listed globally threatened wild life species number 14 (according to the World Conservation Union (IUCN Red List and 23 species according to the CITES. In the rural economy Laos (80 percent of rural households), the dependency on forest resources is great, concentrated in the fields of wild animals and plants, exchanged and extracted for achieving sustainable income; fish is one of main aquatic vertebrates exploited, apart from other terrestrial and aquatic vertebrates.

Given its proximity to Vietnam, the province has traditionally been a source for raw materials and forest products for adjacent regions in Vietnam. Luxury forest products exported by Champa through its seaports were sourced from places as far as Attapeu.

More recently, some Vietnamese companies expanded into Attapeu province. Hoang Anh Gia Lai Group has acquired rights to grow rubber trees in the province. The company also plans to invest in electricity generation, sugar refining, and organic fertilizer production. Construction of a US$100 million sugar project including industrial facilities started in November 2011.

Landmarks 
Some of the important locations in the province are the Wat Sakae Temple which has a sacred Buddha image and is visited during the Lao New Year, and an old pagoda and Xaysetha Stupa in Xaysetha District, built in 1579. The temple of Wat Luang Muang Mai in the capital city of Attapeu was built in 1939 and is notable for original naga barge boards. The Sihanouk Trail branches from the Ho Chi Minh Trail at Phu Vong,  from the capital.

Villages 
 

Xaisi

Gallery

References

Bibliography 
 
 
 
 

 
Provinces of Laos